Chris Quinn is an Australian former rugby league footballer who played in the 1980s and 1990s for Cronulla-Sutherland, St George, Adelaide and Parramatta.  Quinn was a utility back and played in Adelaide's inaugural match.

Playing career
Quinn was a St Patricks junior in the Cronulla-Sutherland District Rugby Football League. Quinn went on to play for the Cronulla Sharks between 1989 and 1994.

Quinn then played for the St. George Dragons between 1995 and 1996.  In 1996, Quinn played in 3 of the club's finals matches but missed out on in playing in the grand final against Manly.

Quinn then played in the Adelaide Rams inaugural side and finished his career with the Parramatta Eels in 1999.

References

1968 births
Living people
Adelaide Rams players
Australian rugby league players
Cronulla-Sutherland Sharks players
Parramatta Eels players
Rugby league fullbacks
Rugby league five-eighths
Rugby league centres
Rugby league players from Sydney
St. George Dragons players